Busy Body is the third studio album by American R&B/soul singer-songwriter Luther Vandross, released on November 25, 1983. It was certified platinum by the RIAA in January 1985. The album was released around the time Michael Jackson's Thriller album was in the charts. It hit the number one position in the week of April 13, 1984 on the US Billboard Album charts.

Track listing

Personnel
 Luther Vandross – lead vocals (1, 2, 3, 5, 6, 7), backing vocals (1, 2, 3, 5, 6, 7), all vocals (4), vocal arrangements
 Nat Adderley, Jr. – keyboards, string arrangements (2, 7), horn arrangements (4, 7), rhythm and synthesizer arrangements (4, 6, 7)
 Marcus Miller – synthesizers (1-5, 7), bass guitar, rhythm and synthesizer arrangements (1, 2, 3, 5)
 John "Skip" Anderson – synthesizers (4, 6, 7)
 Doc Powell – guitar
 Georg Wadenius – guitar
 Yogi Horton – drums
 Paulinho da Costa – percussion
 Michael White – percussion (7)
 Steve Kroon – congas (1, 3, 5, 6, 7), bongos (2, 4)
 Jimmy Webb – horn and string arrangements (6)
 Alfred Brown – horn and string contractor (2, 4, 6, 7)
 Tawatha Agee – backing vocals (1, 2, 3, 5, 7)
 Phillip Ballou – backing vocals (1, 2, 5, 6, 7)
 Robin Clark – backing vocals (1, 2, 3, 5, 7)
 Fonzi Thornton – backing vocals (1, 5)
 Brenda White King – backing vocals (1, 2, 3, 5, 6, 7)
 Alfa Anderson – backing vocals (2, 3, 6)
 Cissy Houston – backing vocals (2, 6)
 David Lasley – backing vocals (3, 5)
 Darlene Love – backing vocals (3, 5)
 Cheryl Lynn – backing vocals (3, 5)
 Paulette McWilliams – backing vocals (3, 5)
 Yvonne Lewis – backing vocals (5, 6)
 Patti Austin – backing vocals (6)
 Michelle Cobbs – backing vocals (6)
 Dionne Warwick – lead vocals (6)

Production
 Marcus Miller – producer (1, 2, 3, 5)
 Luther Vandross – producer
 Larkin Arnold – executive producer
 Ray Bardani – recording, mixing 
 Michael Barbiero – additional engineer 
 Carl Beatty – additional engineer 
 Michael Christopher – additional engineer, assistant engineer 
 Paul Brown – assistant engineer
 Rudy Hill – assistant engineer
 Bruce Robbins – assistant engineer
 Harry Spiridakis – assistant engineer
 Steve Bates – mix assistant 
 Greg Calbi – mastering at Sterling Sound (New York, NY).
 Kate Jansen – album administrator
 Dana Lester – album administrator
 George Corsillo – art direction, design 
 Brian Hagiwara – front and back photography 
 Harry Langdon – photography of Luther Vandross
 Shep Gordon – manager 
 Daniel S. Markus – manager
 Alive Enterprises, Inc. – management company

Charts

Weekly charts

Year-end charts

Certifications

References

1983 albums
Luther Vandross albums
Albums arranged by Jimmy Webb
Albums produced by Luther Vandross
Albums produced by Marcus Miller
Epic Records albums